The Bow River pathway is a pathway system developed along the banks of the Bow River in the city of Calgary. It contains a network of pedestrian and bicycle paths connecting parks on both sides of the river.

The pathway is used for cycling, hiking, jogging, as well as rollerblading and skateboarding. The paths are connected with a system that extends along the Elbow River and other areas of the city.

The network spans  from Bearspaw Dam to Fish Creek Provincial Park, connecting major parks and green areas in Calgary.

Construction of the Bow River Pathways started in 1975 to mark the city's centenary. The project was funded by the City of Calgary, the Province of Alberta and the Devonian Group of Charitable Foundations. It was dedicated on June 25, 1977.

Recreation areas

Recreation areas connected by the pathway include:

See also
List of attractions and landmarks in Calgary

References

External links
City of Calgary. Pathways and Bikeways

Bow River
Parks in Calgary
Tourist attractions in Calgary